The White Sister is a 1923 American silent drama film starring Lillian Gish and Ronald Colman, directed by Henry King, and belatedly released by Metro Pictures. It was based on the 1909 novel of the same name by Francis Marion Crawford. It is the second of four adaptations of the novel, preceded by a 1915 production and followed by a 1933 sound film, starring Helen Hayes and Clark Gable, and a 1960 Mexican production.

Plot
Angela Chiaromonte and Captain Giovanni Severini are deeply in love, but Angela's wealthy father, Prince Chiaromonte, does not know this and arranges her marriage, without her knowledge, to the son of Count del Ferice. However, the prince dies in an accident.

While Angela grieves, her older half-sister, the Marchesa di Mola, looks through their late father's papers and secretly burns one of them. No will can be found, so not only does the entire estate go to the Marchesa, but because the prince's second marriage was not registered with the civil authorities, it is not legally valid, making Angela "nobody". With that, Count del Ferice dissolves the marriage contract between Angela and his son.

The Marchesa orders Angela to leave the palace that very day, revealing that she has always hated her stepsister for "whining" her way into their father's affection and for taking Giovanni, the only man she ever loved. Madame Bernard, Angela's companion and chaperone, takes her in.

Giovanni finds her, but has some bad news. He has been appointed to command an expedition to Africa and must leave the next morning. However, he promises they will be married the day he returns.

His camp is attacked by Arabs, and Italian newspapers announce that all have been massacred. When Angela hears the news, she becomes catatonic. She is taken to the Santa Giovanna d'Aza hospital, which is run by nuns. After several days, the painter Durand, himself hopelessly in love with Angela, paints a portrait of Giovanni and brings it to the hospital, hoping it will help. Angela at first mistakes it for Giovanni, kissing it several times, but then comes to her senses. After a while, she informs Monsignor Seracinesca, an old family friend, that she intends to become a nun, a white sister, in honor of Giovanni.

However, Giovanni is still alive. For two years, he languishes as a captive until the death of his sole comrade gives him the chance to overpower their guard and escape. On the ship back to Italy, he is ordered not to speak to anyone until he has seen the Minister of War. That same day, Angela takes her final vows in a solemn ceremony, dedicating her life to the Catholic Church.

Giovanni's older brother, Professor Ugo Severi, breaks down after years of research trying to harness the power of Mount Vesuvius and is taken to the Santa Giovanna d'Aza hospital. Giovanni visits him, and by chance, meets Angela.  After their initial shock, he embraces and tries to kiss her. She responds at first, but then remembers her circumstances and runs to her room. Monsignor Saracinesca restrains Giovanni from following, explaining that Angela is now married to the Church.

Giovanni refuses to accept that. He lures Angela by false pretenses to his brother's observatory. He tries to get her to sign a petition to the Pope requesting a release from her vows, but she refuses. When Giovanni sees that all his pleadings are useless, he allows her to leave.

The Marchesa tries to persuade Monsignor Saracinesca that Angela has gone willingly to be with her lover. He does not believe her, but sets out for the observatory anyway. Meanwhile, Giovanni notices that his brother's invention indicates that Vesuvius is about to erupt. He rides to warn the townsfolk, passing Saracinesca on the way.

The Marchesa's carriage is wrecked when her horses bolt, startled by lightning. Fatally injured, she crawls and stumbles to an empty church, her only thought to confess her sins before dying. By chance, Angela seeks shelter there. Not recognizing her, the Marchesa confesses she burned the will out of hatred and asks if her sister will forgive her. After a visible struggle with her emotions, Angela says she does, before her sister passes away.

Vesuvius erupts, spewing lava and breaking a water reservoir. However, Giovanni has been in time. Most of the townspeople are saved. Giovanni though drowns helping a mother and her children. Afterward, Angela asks God to keep him safe until they can be reunited.

Cast

Production
Gish turned down a weekly salary of $3500 from Tiffany Pictures and instead signed with Inspiration Pictures for $1500 and a share of the profits. Inspiration had purchased the rights to the novel The White Sister for $16,000.

In November 1922, a crew of 24 set sail for Naples, Italy, aboard the SS Providence for what was to be three months of location shooting. Filming took place in studios in Rome and outdoor locations in Rome and Naples, with the desert scenes shot in Algeria. Gish involved herself in all aspects of the production. The Catholic Church provided guidance on religious matters. Gish stated it took 25 hours straight, with a -hour break, to film the marriage to the Church scene. The production lasted nearly twice as long as planned, due in part to inadequately equipped studio facilities.

Distribution
The film premiered in New York City on September 5, 1923, without a national distribution deal in place. After six months, Metro Pictures agreed to take on the task.

Reception
The anonymous New York Times reviewer wrote that "The film starts out as one of the strongest love stories that has ever been filmed. But the death of Giovanni and the latter part of the story weaken what might have been a perfect love story of Italy."  The critic praised the cast as "excellent", singling out Colman and Kane's performances and observing that "Miss Gish's acting is always restrained. She obtains the full effect in every situation, being, as the Italians say, sympatico in all sequences.

In his review of the 1933 version, New York Times critic Mordaunt Hall found it inferior by comparison, writing, "It is a beautiful production, but its scenes never seem as real as those of the old mute work."

See also
 Lillian Gish filmography

References

External links

Posters at silenthollywood.com

1923 films
1923 romantic drama films
1920s disaster films
American disaster films
American romantic drama films
American silent feature films
American black-and-white films
Remakes of American films
Films about volcanoes
Films based on American novels
Films based on works by Francis Marion Crawford
Films directed by Henry King
Films set in Italy
Films shot in Algeria
Films shot in Naples
Films shot in Rome
1920s American films
Silent romantic drama films
Silent American drama films
1920s English-language films